The 2006 Qatar motorcycle Grand Prix was the second race of the 2006 Motorcycle Grand Prix season. It took place on the weekend of 6 –8 April 2006 at the Losail Circuit.

MotoGP classification

250 cc classification

125 cc classification

Championship standings after the race (motoGP)

Below are the standings for the top five riders and constructors after round two has concluded.

Riders' Championship standings

Constructors' Championship standings

 Note: Only the top five positions are included for both sets of standings.

References

Qatar motorcycle Grand Prix
Qatar
Motorcycle Grand Prix